Flávio Miguel Magalhães Sousa Meireles (born 3 October 1976) is a Portuguese retired footballer who played as a defensive midfielder, and is the director of football of Vitória de Guimarães.

Most of his 16-year professional career was associated with Vitória de Guimarães, which he represented in three different spells, appearing in nearly 250 official games.

Club career
Born in Ribeira de Pena, Vila Real District, Meireles began his professional career with Vitória de Guimarães, having no impact whatsoever at the club in his first spell and moving to the lower leagues in 1996, first with Moreirense FC (where he also appeared very rarely, in the second division) then AD Fafe.

Meireles returned to Vitória in 1999, meeting the same fate and quickly moving again to Fafe. The following season he switched to another former side, Moreirense, being instrumental as they – also based in Guimarães – promoted from the third level to the Primeira Liga in only two years, under manager Manuel Machado.

For the 2003–04 campaign, Meireles re-joined Vitória de Guimarães for a third spell. His first appearance was on 18 August 2003, when he played the entire 1–0 home win over U.D. Leiria. At the Minho team, he was now an automatic first-choice and team captain from the start, helping them achieve promotion in 2007 and qualifying to the UEFA Champions League in the following season, with the player appearing in all games but one and scoring three goals; in two different stints at the Estádio D. Afonso Henriques, he was again coached by Machado.

On 22 May 2011, after appearing in the final of the Portuguese Cup against FC Porto, 34-year-old Meireles announced his immediate retirement from football. Shortly after, he was appointed as a coach at the club.

In May 2012, still with Vitória, Meireles was appointed new director of football. In remained in the position for several years.

References

External links

1976 births
Living people
Portuguese footballers
Association football midfielders
Primeira Liga players
Liga Portugal 2 players
Segunda Divisão players
Vitória S.C. players
Moreirense F.C. players
AD Fafe players
Sportspeople from Vila Real District